Coccophagus is a large genus of chalcid wasps belonging to the family Aphelinidae.

Species
Coccophagus contains the following species:

 Coccophagus ablusus Annecke and Insley, 1974
 Coccophagus acanthosceles Waterston, 1916
 Coccophagus adumbratus Annecke and Insley, 1970
 Coccophagus adustus (Annecke and Prinsloo, 1976)
 Coccophagus aethiopis Girault, 1935
 Coccophagus aethochreus Annecke and Insley, 1974
 Coccophagus afrangiatus Viggiani, 1994
 Coccophagus africanus Risbec, 1956
 Coccophagus albiapicella De Santis, 1996
 Coccophagus albicoxa Howard, 1911
 Coccophagus albifuniculatus (Huang, 1994)
 Coccophagus amblydon Compere, 1937
 Coccophagus amoenus Hayat, 2015
 Coccophagus anchoroides (Huang, 1994)
 Coccophagus angolensis Annecke and Insley, 1974
 Coccophagus anthracinus Compere, 1925
 Coccophagus apricus Annecke and Insley, 1970
 Coccophagus argenteus Girault, 1915
 Coccophagus argentifascia Girault, 1915
 Coccophagus argentiscutellum (Girault, 1915)
 Coccophagus argocoxa Annecke and Insley, 1974
 Coccophagus assamensis Hayat, 1993
 Coccophagus asterolecanii (Dozier, 1932)
 Coccophagus atratus Compere, 1926
 Coccophagus aurantifrons (Compere, 1936)
 Coccophagus aureonotus (Howard, 1897)
 Coccophagus auricaput Girault, 1915
 Coccophagus avetianae Yasnosh and Herthevtzian, 1972
 Coccophagus baldassarii Compere, 1931
 Coccophagus bartletti Annecke and Insley, 1974
 Coccophagus basalis Compere, 1939
 Coccophagus berzeliae Annecke and Insley, 1974
 Coccophagus biguttatus Girault, 1915
 Coccophagus bimaculatus Myartseva, 2004
 Coccophagus bivittatus Compere, 1931
 Coccophagus bogoriensis (Koningsberger, 1897)
 Coccophagus brachypterus Sugonjaev, 2011
 Coccophagus brasiliensis (Compere, 1936)
 Coccophagus brethesi De Santis, 1967
 Coccophagus breviscapus Li and Chen, 2017
 Coccophagus brevisetus Huang, 1980
 Coccophagus brunneus Provancher, 1887
 Coccophagus burksi Hayat, 1971
 Coccophagus candidus Hayat, 1993
 Coccophagus caophongi Sugonjaev, 1996
 Coccophagus capensis Compere, 1931
 Coccophagus caridei (Brethes, 1918)
 Coccophagus catherinae Annecke, 1964
 Coccophagus caudatus (Huang, 1994)
 Coccophagus ceroplastae (Howard, 1895)
 Coccophagus chaetosus Sugonjaev, 1995
 Coccophagus chengtuensis Sugonjaev and Peng, 1960
 Coccophagus chilensis De Santis, 1988
 Coccophagus chloropulvinariae Hayat, 1974
 Coccophagus cinguliventris Girault, 1909
 Coccophagus clavatus Husain and Agarwal, 1982
 Coccophagus clavellatus Compere, 1931
 Coccophagus coccidarum (Ghesquiere, 1949)
 Coccophagus comperei Mercet, 1932
 Coccophagus concinnus De Santis, 1963
 Coccophagus conditus Annecke and Insley, 1974
 Coccophagus cooperatus Sugonjaev and Ren, 1993
 Coccophagus copernicus Husain and Agarwal, 1982
 Coccophagus coracinus Compere, 1940
 Coccophagus cowperi Girault, 1917
 Coccophagus crenatus Huang, 1980
 Coccophagus croconotus (Waterston, 1917)
 Coccophagus crucigerus Girault, 1931
 Coccophagus cryptus Annecke and Insley, 1974
 Coccophagus cubaensis Compere, 1931
 Coccophagus debachi Myartseva and Ruiz, 2005
 Coccophagus desantisi (Fidalgo, 1981)
 Coccophagus desertus Sugonjaev and Myartseva, 1984
 Coccophagus diabolicus (Girault, 1915)
 Coccophagus diachraceus Annecke and Insley, 1974
 Coccophagus differens Yasnosh, 1966
 Coccophagus dilatatus (Huang, 1994)
 Coccophagus diminutus Sugonjaev, 1995
 Coccophagus distinctus Li and Chen, 2017
 Coccophagus dius Hayat, 1998
 Coccophagus divisus Hayat, 2015
 Coccophagus eleaphilus Silvestri, 1915
 Coccophagus emersoni Girault, 1917
 Coccophagus equifuniculatus (Huang, 1994)
 Coccophagus eusaissetiae Ozdikmen, 2011
 Coccophagus euxanthodes Hayat, Schroer and Pemberton, 2009
 Coccophagus excelsus Erdos, 1956
 Coccophagus exiguiventris Girault, 1929
 Coccophagus fallax Compere, 1939
 Coccophagus fasciatus Annecke and Insley, 1970
 Coccophagus femoralis Myartseva, 2006
 Coccophagus flavescens Howard, 1896
 Coccophagus flaviceps Compere, 1931
 Coccophagus flavicorpus Husain and Agarwal, 1982
 Coccophagus flavidus Compere, 1940
 Coccophagus flavifrons Howard, 1885
 Coccophagus flavoscutellum Ashmead, 1881
 Coccophagus fletcheri Howard, 1897
 Coccophagus fraternus Howard, 1881
 Coccophagus fumadus Hayat, 2010
 Coccophagus funeralis Girault, 1913
 Coccophagus funiculatus Mysartseva, 2016
 Coccophagus gahani Annecke and Insley, 1974
 Coccophagus ghesquierei Hayat, 1987
 Coccophagus gigas Erdos, 1956
 Coccophagus gilvus Hayat, 1971
 Coccophagus gondolae (Castel-Branco, 1951)
 Coccophagus gonzalezi Myartseva, 2006
 Coccophagus gossypariae Gahan, 1927
 Coccophagus graminis Annecke and Insley, 1974
 Coccophagus gregarius Compere, 1931
 Coccophagus grenadensis Hayat, 1994
 Coccophagus gurneyi Compere, 1929
 Coccophagus hanoiensis Sugonjaev, 1996
 Coccophagus hawaiiensis Timberlake, 1926
 Coccophagus hemera (Walker, 1839)
 Coccophagus hibisci Sugonjaev and Ren, 1993
 Coccophagus hispaniolae (Dozier, 1932)
 Coccophagus immaculatus Howard, 1881
 Coccophagus impensus Annecke and Insley, 1974
 Coccophagus indefinitus Myartseva, 2014
 Coccophagus indochraceus Hayat, 1998
 Coccophagus inkermani Girault, 1926
 Coccophagus insidiator (Dalman, 1826)
 Coccophagus insignis Hayat and Zeya, 1993
 Coccophagus ishiii Compere, 1931
 Coccophagus isipingoensis Compere, 1931
 Coccophagus japonicus Compere, 1924
 Coccophagus jasnoshae Sugonjaev, 1978
 Coccophagus javensis Girault, 1916
 Coccophagus kabulensis Sugonjaev, 1985
 Coccophagus kvavadze Japoshvili and Karaca, 2002
 Coccophagus lepidus Compere, 1931
 Coccophagus leptospermi Girault, 1917
 Coccophagus lii (Huang, 1994)
 Coccophagus longiclavatus Shafee, 1972
 Coccophagus longicornis Hayat, 1971
 Coccophagus longifasciatus Howard, 1907
 Coccophagus longipedicellus Shafee, 1972
 Coccophagus lucani Girault, 1922
 Coccophagus lucidus Ishihara, 1977
 Coccophagus luciensis Annecke and Insley, 1974
 Coccophagus lunai Myartseva, 2006
 Coccophagus lutescens Compere, 1931
 Coccophagus lycimnia (Walker, 1839)
 Coccophagus maculipennis Yasnosh, 1966
 Coccophagus malthusi Girault, 1917
 Coccophagus mangiferae (Dozier, 1932)
 Coccophagus margaritatus Compere, 1931
 Coccophagus mariformis Compere, 1931
 Coccophagus matsuyamensis Ishihara, 1977
 Coccophagus mazatlan Myartseva, 2006
 Coccophagus meghaianus Hayat, 2010
 Coccophagus merceti Hayat, 1994
 Coccophagus mexicanus Girault, 1915
 Coccophagus mexicensis Girault, 1917
 Coccophagus minor Myartseva, 2014
 Coccophagus mixtus (Girault, 1915)
 Coccophagus modestus Silvestri, 1915
 Coccophagus multisetae Girault, 1931
 Coccophagus narendrani Hayat and Zeya, 1993
 Coccophagus neocomperei Myartseva and Ruiz, 2005
 Coccophagus neserorum (Annecke and Mynhardt, 1979)
 Coccophagus nesiotes Hayat, 2015
 Coccophagus nigrans Myartseva, 2006
 Coccophagus nigricorpus Shafee, 1972
 Coccophagus nigricoxae Karam and Ramadan, 2013
 Coccophagus nigritus Compere, 1931
 Coccophagus nigropleurum Girault, 1917
 Coccophagus nipponicus (Ishihara, 1977)
 Coccophagus nubeculus Brethes, 1913
 Coccophagus nubes Compere, 1928
 Coccophagus nympha (Girault, 1915)
 Coccophagus obscurus Westwood, 1833
 Coccophagus ochraceus Howard, 1895
 Coccophagus oculatipennis (Girault, 1916)
 Coccophagus ophicus Husain and Agarwal, 1982
 Coccophagus palaeolecanii Yasnosh, 1957
 Coccophagus pallidiceps (Compere, 1939)
 Coccophagus pallidis Huang, 1980
 Coccophagus parlobatae Hayat, 2007
 Coccophagus pellucidus (Huang, 1994)
 Coccophagus perflavus Girault, 1916
 Coccophagus perhispidus Girault, 1926
 Coccophagus pernigritus De Santis, 1948
 Coccophagus philippiae (Silvestri, 1915)
 Coccophagus physokermis Sugonjaev and Pilipyuk, 1972
 Coccophagus piceae Erdos, 1956
 Coccophagus pisinnus Annecke and Insley, 1974
 Coccophagus planus (Sugonjaev, 1969)
 Coccophagus poei Girault, 1915
 Coccophagus princeps Silvestri, 1915
 Coccophagus prinslooi Hayat, 1998
 Coccophagus probus Annecke and Mynhardt, 1979
 Coccophagus propodealis Myartseva, 2004
 Coccophagus provisus Sugonjaev and Ren, 1993
 Coccophagus proximus Yasnosh, 1966
 Coccophagus pseudococci Compere, 1933
 Coccophagus pseudopulvinariae Li, 1996
 Coccophagus pulchellus Westwood, 1833
 Coccophagus pulcher (Girault, 1914)
 Coccophagus pulcini Girault, 1926
 Coccophagus pulvinariae Compere, 1931
 Coccophagus pumilus Sugonjaev, 1994
 Coccophagus purpureus Ashmead, 1886
 Coccophagus qenai Abd-Rabou, 2003
 Coccophagus quaestor Girault, 1917
 Coccophagus redini Girault, 1924
 Coccophagus restionis Annecke and Insley, 1970
 Coccophagus rjabovi Yasnosh, 1966
 Coccophagus robustus Compere, 1931
 Coccophagus rosae Sugonjaev and Pilipyuk, 1972
 Coccophagus ruizi Myartseva, 2004
 Coccophagus rusti Compere, 1928
 Coccophagus saintebeauvei Girault, 1917
 Coccophagus saissetiae Gahan, 1922
 Coccophagus saltator Sugonjaev, 1994
 Coccophagus samarae Hayat, 1998
 Coccophagus scutatus Howard, 1895
 Coccophagus scutellaris (Dalman, 1826)
 Coccophagus secamonei Risbec, 1957
 Coccophagus semiatratus De Santis, 1947
 Coccophagus semicircularis (Foerster, 1841)
 Coccophagus sexvittatus Hayat, 1974
 Coccophagus shafeei Hayat, 1974
 Coccophagus shakespearella Girault, 1929
 Coccophagus shillongensis Hayat and Singh, 1989
 Coccophagus sibiricus Sugonjaev, 1976
 Coccophagus signatus Yasnosh, 1966
 Coccophagus signus Girault, 1920
 Coccophagus silvestrii Compere, 1931
 Coccophagus sostenesi Myartseva, 2006
 Coccophagus spartanus Japoshvili and Karaca, 2002
 Coccophagus specialis Compere, 1931
 Coccophagus speciosus Compere, 1931
 Coccophagus spectabilis Compere, 1931
 Coccophagus spireae Nikolskaya and Yasnosh, 1966
 Coccophagus srilankensis Hayat, 1988
 Coccophagus subflavescens Hayat, 1971
 Coccophagus subochraceus Howard, 1907
 Coccophagus subsignus Girault, 1932
 Coccophagus sudhiri Hayat, 1993
 Coccophagus tamaulipecus Myartseva, 2014
 Coccophagus tarongaensis Compere, 1931
 Coccophagus teeceeni Myartseva, 2004
 Coccophagus tenebrisetus Li and Chen, 2017
 Coccophagus terani De Santis, 1993
 Coccophagus tetrastichoides Sugonjaev, 2006
 Coccophagus thanhoaensis Sugonjaev, 2011
 Coccophagus tibialis Compere, 1931
 Coccophagus timberlakei Compere, 1931
 Coccophagus tobiasi Myartseva, 2004
 Coccophagus triangulatinotus Girault, 1926
 Coccophagus triguttatus Girault, 1915
 Coccophagus tropicanus Sugonjaev and Ren, 1993
 Coccophagus tschirchii Mahdihassan, 1923
 Coccophagus ussuriensis Sugonjaev, 1979
 Coccophagus varius (Silvestri, 1915)
 Coccophagus vegai Girault, 1932
 Coccophagus viator Sugonjaev, 1960
 Coccophagus vietnamicus Sugonjaev, 1998
 Coccophagus yoshidae Nakayama, 1921
 Coccophagus youngi (Girault, 1917)
 Coccophagus zebratus Howard, 1907
 Coccophagus zeyai Hayat, 1998
 Coccophagus zinniae De Santis, 1979
 Coccophagus formicariae Hayat, 1998

References

Aphelinidae
Taxa named by John O. Westwood